Liubomyr Huzar MSU (26 February 1933 – 31 May 2017) was the Major Archbishop of the Ukrainian Greek Catholic Church and the first elected in independent Ukraine. He was also a cardinal of the Catholic Church. After the transfer of the see of Lviv to Kyiv in 2005, he was the Ukrainian Catholic Major Archbishop of Kyiv-Galicia. In February 2011 he became Major Archeparch Emeritus after he resigned due to ill health.

Biography

Early life and ordination
He was born in what is now the city of Lwów (now Lviv, Ukraine), in the family of Yaroslav Huzar and Rostyslava Demchuk (Demczuk). Luka Demchuk (Demczuk), the Priest of the Parish of village Kal'ne from 1909 to 1929, was the maternal grandfather of Cardinal Liubomyr Huzar. Huzar emigrated with his parents in 1944 during World War II due to the advancing Soviet Army. At first the Huzar family briefly lived in Salzburg, Austria, then emigrated to the United States in 1949.

From 1950 to 1954 he studied at St. Basil College Seminary in Stamford, Connecticut. He studied at The Catholic University of America.Later studied at Fordham University in the United States, and was ordained a priest on 30 March 1958 for the Ukrainian Catholic Eparchy of Stamford.

Pastoral work
From 1958 to 1969, he taught at St. Basil College Seminary and was pastor at Holy Trinity Ukrainian Catholic Church in Kerhonkson, New York between 1966 and 1969. In 1969, Huzar went to Rome, where he spent three years earning a doctorate in theology at the Pontifical Urbaniana University. He then entered the Monastery of the Studites in Castel Gandolfo in Italy, and was named its Superior in 1974.

Bishop
He was consecrated a bishop in 1977 in the Castel Gandolfo chapel by Major Archbishop Josyf Slipyj with help of titular bishop of Zigris Ivan Prasko and bishop of Toronto Isidore Borecky without papal approval (apostolic mandate) in an act which caused many irritations in the Roman Curia, as canon law required papal permission for the consecration of a bishop. He was named Archimandrite (Archabbot) of the Studite Monks in Europe and America in 1978. He organised a new Studite monastery in Ternopil, Ukraine, in 1994, and was elected by the Synod of Bishops of the Ukrainian Church as exarch of the archiepiscopal exarchy of Kyiv and Vyshhorod in 1995, confirmed by the Pope the following year (February 1996) by nominating to the titular see of Nisa di Licia. On 14 October 1996 the UGCC Synod of Bishops named Huzar auxiliary of the Archbishop Major of Lviv as coadjutor with special delegations. In October 1999 he attended the 2nd Special Assembly for Europe. Although once a citizen of the United States, Huzar gave up his U.S. citizenship after transferring to Ukraine, and adopted the citizenship of Ukraine.

Major Archbishop and Cardinal

In December 2000, Pope John Paul II named Huzar apostolic administrator of the Ukrainian Greek Major-Archeparchy of Lviv, and in January 2001 the Ukrainian Greek synod elected him Major Archbishop which was approved by the Pope the next day. On 21 February of that year Pope John Paul II made Huzar Cardinal-Priest of Santa Sofia a Via Boccea. Cardinal Huzar was one of the three Eastern Catholics to participate in the papal conclave, 2005, the others being Ignace Daoud of the Syriac Catholic Church and Varkey Vithayathil of the Syro-Malabar Church. (Nasrallah Boutros Sfeir and Stéphanos II Ghattas of the Maronite Church and Coptic Catholic Church respectively were both over 80 and therefore could not take part.) At that papal conclave, he was one of the cardinals considered papabile, something unusual for an Eastern Catholic. Also at that conclave, Cardinal Huzar was the first Major-Archbishop from the Ukrainian Greek Catholic Church ever to participate in a papal conclave as cardinal-elector.

Huzar was one of about a dozen like-minded European prelates who met annually from 1995 to 2006 in St. Gallen, Switzerland, to discuss reforms with respect to the appointment of bishops, collegiality, bishops' conferences, the primacy of the papacy and sexual morality; they differed among themselves, but shared the view that Cardinal Joseph Ratzinger was not the sort of candidate they hoped to see elected at the next conclave.

The major archiepiscopal see of Lviv was moved on 21 August 2005, to the city of Kyiv, the capital of Ukraine. He was acclaimed by his followers as Patriarch of Kyiv-Galicia, a title not recognised by the Holy See.

In October 2007, Huzar received an honorary doctorate from the Catholic University of America in conjunction with the 100th anniversary of the first assigning of a bishop of the UGCC to the United States.

In February 2008, a celebratory liturgy was held in the Basilica of Santa Sophia in Rome on the occasion of the 75th birthday and 50th anniversary of priesthood of Cardinal Huzar. The Head of the UGCC was greeted by Pope Benedict XVI, whose address was read by the secretary of Cardinal Leonardo Sandri, Monsignor Maurizio Malvestiti.

In 2008 Viktor Yushchenko signed a decree to decorate Cardinal Huzar with the Order of Prince Yaroslav the Wise (the 3rd class). He was honoured with the highest state award "for his outstanding personal contribution in spiritual revival of the Ukrainian nation, longstanding church work, and to mark his 75th birthday".

With failing eyesight due to poorly treated eye disease forcing him to perform the church's intricate liturgical rites from memory, his early resignation was accepted on 10 February 2011 although normally the major archbishop serves for life. Cardinal Huzar's resignation triggered a meeting of the Synod of the Ukrainian church, comprising its global body of bishops, to elect a new major archbishop, which must begin within a month. In the interim, Ihor Vozniak, C.SS.R., Archeparch of Lviv, served as administrator. The last time a Ukrainian Major Archbishop left office while living was in 1882. The new Major Archbishop, Sviatoslav Shevchuk, was elected by the Ukrainian Synod on 23 March and confirmed by Pope Benedict XVI on 25 March 2011.

On 26 February 2013, 2 days before the announced resignation of Pope Benedict XVI, Cardinal Huzar turned 80 and lost his right to participate in a conclave.

He died on 31 May 2017 at the age of 84.

Notes

Sources and references

External links
 Cardinalrating pages concerning him
 An interview published in February 2004 by Zerkalo Nedeli (Mirror Weekly), Kyiv, in Ukrainian and in Russian.
 Biography at Catholic-pages.com
 Biography at Catholic-hierarchy.com

1933 births
2017 deaths
Metropolitans of Kyiv-Galicia
Metropolitans of Galicia (1808-2005)
Clergy from Lviv
People from Lwów Voivodeship
Ukrainian cardinals
Catholic University of America alumni
Fordham University alumni
Pontifical Urban University alumni
Cardinals created by Pope John Paul II
Studite Brethren
Members of the Pontifical Council for Culture
Naturalized citizens of Ukraine
20th-century Eastern Catholic bishops
21st-century Eastern Catholic archbishops
Former United States citizens
Eastern Catholic bishops in Ukraine
Recipients of the Order of Prince Yaroslav the Wise, 3rd class